Azzaman ( meaning The Time) is a daily Iraqi newspaper published simultaneously in London, Baghdad and Beirut by Saad al Bazzaz.

Influence and views
A recent poll conducted by researchers at Baghdad University found that readers in southern Iraq regard the Arab-language Azzaman as "neutral and independent" as well as "highly objective", and that it is the most popular news source in the area.  The international edition, Azzaman in English, is fiercely critical of the U.S. occupation in its editorials, accusing U.S. leaders of violating "every single article of international conventions laid down to regulate the behavior of occupation troops" and of deploying "shallow, naive, and childish" rhetoric to defend their goals in the region.

Controversy
In 2005, Azzaman lost a libel lawsuit, and issued strong retractions of its previous allegations against Mozah bint Nasser Al Missned. It emerged during the trial that the paper had accepted money from Saudi authorities to do propaganda and intelligence work for the Saudi government. Azzaman and Bazzaz agreed to pay £10,000 in damages and £500,000 in costs to her solicitors.

References 

Newspapers published in Iraq
Arabic-language newspapers
Bilingual newspapers
Mass media in Baghdad